Promod is a French women's ready-to-wear retailer operating in France, Belgium, Switzerland and Luxembourg. The clothing brand can be found in their own shops, or in concessions inside larger retail shops. 

Promod was founded as a family boutique in 1975 by Francis-Charles Pollet, one of the heirs of the founder of La Redoute where he spent the first part of his career. The brand established exclusively in France and Belgium until 1990, when started to develop more internationally and opened a subsidiary in Spain, followed by others mainly in Europe.

In 2014, Promod had over 1,066 stores in 52 countries with gross sales exceeded 1 billion euros.

In 2016, a decline in the profitability of foreign operations led the company to eliminate 130 jobs and close international franchise partnerships that led to the closure of about 500 stores mainly in Europe, which accounted for half of the total number of Promod stores.

In September 2018, Patrice Lepoutre leaves the management of the group in favor of Julien Pollet.

References

External links

Official website

Clothing companies of France
Clothing companies established in 1975
Companies based in Hauts-de-France
Retail companies established in 1975